CAA may refer to:

Law
 Citizenship (Amendment) Act, 2019 of India 
 Protests regarding the Citizenship (Amendment) Act
 Clean Air Act, United States law to reduce air pollution
 Congressional Apportionment Amendment, unratified pending United States constitutional amendment
 Copyright assignment agreement, to transfer copyright to another party
 Cuban Adjustment Act, United States federal law

Organizations

Arts
 China Academy of Art, a fine arts college in China founded in 1928
 College Art Association, a professional arts association in the US 
 Concert Artistes Association, founded 1897

Automobile
 Canadian Automobile Association, a federation of clubs across Canada
 China Automobile Association, a roadside assistance provider in China owned by Insurance Australia Group
 Cyprus Automobile Association, a non-profit organization, providing roadside assistance services

Aviation

Airlines
 CAA, ICAO airline designator for Atlantic Southeast Airlines, a defunct carrier in the United States
 Central African Airways, a defunct airline, national carrier for the Central African Federation
 Compagnie Africaine d'Aviation, a Congolese airline

Regulatory agencies
 Civil aviation authority (CAA), general term for a statutory authority that oversees the regulation of civil aviation
 Civil Aviation Authority, the name of these countries' regulators:
 Civil Aviation Authority (New Zealand)
 Civil Aviation Authority (South Africa)
 Civil Aviation Authority (United Kingdom)
 Civil Aviation Authority (Moldova) (formerly Civil Aviation Administration in English)
 Civil Aviation Authority of Norway
 Civil Aviation Agency, the name of two countries' regulators in English:
 Civil Aviation Agency Slovenia
 Latvian Civil Aviation Agency
 Civil Aeronautics Administration (disambiguation), two national regulators:
 Civil Aeronautics Administration (Taiwan), a division of Ministry of Transportation and Communication
 Civil Aeronautics Administration (United States), formed in 1938 and split into two agencies in 1940

Other
 Children's Air Ambulance, air ambulance for children in the UK

Science
 Canadian Archaeological Association, publishes archaeological literature 
 Canadian Avalanche Association, avalanche awareness and safety
 Carinthian Astronomical Association (Astronomische Vereinigung Kärntens), Austria
 Center for American Archeology, in Kampsville, Illinois, an independent non-profit research and education
 Computer Applications and Quantitative Methods in Archaeology (CAA) - international organization of archaeologists, organizes an annual conference

Sports and Entertainment
 Canyon Athletic Association, an association to organize sports for smaller charter schools in the state of Arizona
 Colonial Athletic Association, an NCAA Division I college athletic conference whose full-time members are in East Coast US states
 Confederation of African Athletics, a continental association for the sport of athletics in Africa
 Creative Artists Agency, an American talent and sports agency
 Cycle Action Auckland, a pro-cycling advocacy group in Auckland, New Zealand

Other organizations
 Campaign Against Antisemitism, a UK organisation
 California Alumni Association, the alumni association of the University of California, Berkeley
 Case Alumni Association, oldest independent alumni organization in the US
 Cat Aficionado Association, a registry of pedigreed felines in China
 Center for Academic Advancement, a part of the Johns Hopkins University Center for Talented Youth
 Center for Army Analysis, US
 China Advertising Association
 Commission for Academic Accreditation, United Arab Emirates
 Commonwealth Association of Architects, an organisation for architects in commonwealth countries
 Council on African Affairs, provided information about Africa to the US, particularly to African Americans

Science and technology
 Cerebral amyloid angiopathy, a form of angiopathy
 Computational aeroacoustics, direct simulation of acoustic fields associated with flows
 Computer-aided assessment, assessment performed or mediated through computer methods
 Computer-aided auscultation, computer analysis of stethoscope data
 DNS Certification Authority Authorization, a method for cross-checking security information on the Internet
 Cover Art Archive, a project hosting album cover art images
 CAA, one of the codons for the amino acid glutamine

Other uses
 Command Arms and Accessories, an Israeli firearms manufacturer of Kalashnikov style weapons
 Coventry Arena railway station, station code "CAA"
 Chester A. Arthur, 21st president of the United States